Nikanorovka is a rural locality (a sloboda) in Voloshynskoye Selsoviet of Millerovsky District, in Rostov Oblast, Russia. Population:

References 

Rural localities in Rostov Oblast